Welcome Back, Kotter is an American television  comedy sitcom that originally aired on the ABC network from September 9, 1975 to June 8, 1979.

The show stars comedian Gabe Kaplan as the title character Gabe Kotter, a wise-cracking teacher who returns to his high school alma mater—the fictional James Buchanan High in Brooklyn, New York—to teach an often unruly group of remedial wiseguys known as the "Sweathogs" (the nickname reflecting the fact that the remedial classes were held on the very top floor of the high school). The school's principal was perpetually absent, while the uptight vice principal dismissed the Sweathogs as worthless hoodlums and only expected Kotter to attempt to control them until they inevitably dropped out.

Ninety-five episodes were produced during Welcome Back, Kotters four-year run. The show's producers did not know for certain that the show would be cancelled after the 1978–79 season due to declining ratings. Kotter has no official finale with the long-awaited graduation for the Sweathogs. Instead, the last original episode dealt with a feud that ensues when Washington (Lawrence Hilton-Jacobs) gets an after-school job Epstein (Robert Hegyes) felt was rightly his.

Series overview

Episodes

Season 1 (1975–76)

Season 2 (1976–77)

Season 3 (1977–78)

Season 4 (1978–79)

References

External links
 
 

Lists of American sitcom episodes
Lists of American teen comedy television series episodes